Bill Courtney may refer to:

 Bill Courtney (American football) (born 1968), American high school football coach
 Bill Courtney (basketball) (born 1970), American college basketball coach